The 2008–09 season was Falkirk's fourth consecutive season in the Scottish Premier League. Falkirk also competed in the League Cup and the Scottish Cup.

Summary
In their fourth season in the SPL, Falkirk finished in tenth place. The club reached the semi-final of the League Cup, and ended as runners in the Scottish Cup, losing to Rangers in both matches.

Results

Pre-season

Scottish Premier League

Scottish League Cup

Scottish Cup

Squad statistics

Player statistics

|-
|colspan="12"|Players who left the club during the 2008–09 season
|-

|}

Team statistics

League table

Transfers

Players in

Players out

References

2008-09
Scottish football clubs 2008–09 season